Rebecca Vassarotti (born 1972) is a member of parliament in the Australian Capital Territory Legislative Assembly representing the ACT Greens.

Vassarotti was born and raised in Canberra. Her mother was a teacher and is an advocate for public schooling.

Vassarotti spent ten years with the YWCA in Canberra, including as executive director. She worked as a consultant in the not for profit sector, and was director on the board of numerous companies. She was a finalist for the ACT Australian of the Year. She is also an advocate for a reduction in the access to poker machines and is the Greens spokesperson on that issue.

At the 2020 Australian Capital Territory general election Vassarotti won one of the five seats in Kurrajong, taking the seat from the Liberals' Candice Burch. Following agreement between Labor and the Greens that the latter have three ministerial portfolios, Vassarotti immediately was appointed Minister for Environment and Heritage, Minister for Homelessness and Housing Services, and Minister for Sustainable Building and Construction.

References 

1972 births
Living people
Members of the Australian Capital Territory Legislative Assembly
Australian Greens members of the Australian Capital Territory Legislative Assembly
21st-century Australian politicians
Women members of the Australian Capital Territory Legislative Assembly
21st-century Australian women politicians